Sukhoy Karasuk (Sook-Karasuu) is a rural locality (a selo) in Paspaulskoye Rural Settlement of Choysky District, the Altai Republic, Russia. The population was 3 as of 2016. There are 4 streets.

Geography 
Sukhoy Karasuk is located 33 km southwest of Choya (the district's administrative centre) by road. Sugul is the nearest rural locality.

References 

Rural localities in Choysky District